Harold Wright (1884–1974) was a notable greyhound trainer, famed for training nine winners of the Waterloo Cup. Born in Ditton, Lancashire he was the eldest son of Joe Wright, who achieved training success with two Waterloo Cup winners in the late 19th century. He established his kennels initially at Preston Brook, Cheshire and then later at Formby, Lancashire. Among the noted owners that he trained for were; Lord Tweedmouth, the Duke of Leeds, Major Hugh Peel, of Bryn-Y-Pys, Overton-on-Dee and Colonel J.E. Dennis.

The following is a list of the Waterloo Cup winning greyhounds that he trained:
1912 Tide Time
1922 Guards Brigade
1934 Bryn Truthful
1935 Dee Rock
1940 Dee Flint
1941 Swinging Light
1942 Swinging Light
1945 Bryn Tritoma
1946 Maesydd Michael

References

Dog trainers
1884 births
1974 deaths